Podmilj (in older sources Podmil) is a former settlement in the Municipality of Litija in central Slovenia. It is now part of the village of Mamolj. The area is part of the traditional region of Lower Carniola and is now included with the rest of the municipality in the Central Sava Statistical Region.

Geography
Podmilj stands in the southwestern part of Mamolj, along the road to Gradiške Laze.

History
Podmilj had a population of 26 living in four houses in 1900. Podmilj was annexed by Mamolj in 1952, ending its existence as a separate settlement.

References

External links
Podmilj on Geopedia

Populated places in the Municipality of Litija